KBLQ-FM (92.9 FM, "Q92") is a radio station broadcasting an adult contemporary format. Licensed to Logan, Utah, United States, it serves the Logan area. The station is currently owned by Sun Valley Radio incorporated.

Translators and booster
In addition to the main station, KBLQ is relayed by an additional five translators and a booster to widen its broadcast area.

References

External links

 

BLQ-FM